is a train station located in Ogōri, Fukuoka.

Lines 
Nishi-Nippon Railroad
Tenjin Ōmuta Line

Platforms

Adjacent stations

Surrounding area
 Seiwa Memorial Hospital
 Ogōritsuko Post Office
 Kurita Nose And Ears Throat Department Tracheoesophageal Clinic
 Hachiryu Shrine

Railway stations in Fukuoka Prefecture
Railway stations in Japan opened in 1924